"Gamla Ullevi" / "Skisser för sommaren" is double A-side single by the Swedish alternative rock band Kent. It was released on 14 June 2010 as the lead single from their ninth studio album, En plats i solen. It is their second double A-side single following "FF" / "VinterNoll2" from 2002. Both tracks charted in the top of the Swedish chart, as number one and two respectively.

Track listing

Charts

References

Kent (band) songs
2010 singles
Song recordings produced by Joshua (record producer)
Number-one singles in Sweden
Songs written by Joakim Berg
Songs written by Martin Sköld